Heparin necrosis is a cutaneous condition and usually occurs between days 5 and 10 of heparin therapy.

See also 
 Warfarin necrosis
 List of cutaneous conditions

References 

Drug eruptions